Rijsbergen  a town in the municipality of Zundert in the southern Netherlands.

In the town used to be an AC (Aanmeldcentrum, i.e. Asylum Request Center).

Until 1997 Rijsbergen was an independent municipality, after which it was added to Zundert.

The skyline of Rijsbergen is dominated by the neo-Gothic Roman Catholic church of Saint Bavo, which was built in 1918 as a replacement of a smaller fourteenth-century church.
The church is situated in the town centre and is flanked by the former town hall, which has been transformed into a museum. Furthermore, in the outskirts of Rijsbergen a successful Garden Centre can be found named: "De Bosrand". A deeply loved place by the locals. 

The countryside around Rijsbergen is dotted with eleven shrines devoted to the Virgin Mary. They were built after the Second World War as a thanksgiving for surviving the war relatively undamaged.

Gallery

References

Municipalities of the Netherlands disestablished in 1997
Populated places in North Brabant
Former municipalities of North Brabant
Zundert